This is a list of Bulgarian football transfers in the summer transfer window 2011 by club. Only transfers of the A PFG are included.

Beroe

In:

Out:

Botev Vratsa

In:

Out:

Cherno More

In:

Out:

Chernomorets

In:

Out:

CSKA Sofia

In:

Out:

Kaliakra

In:

Out:

Levski

In:

Out:

Litex

In:

Out:

Lokomotiv Plovdiv

In:

Out:

Lokomotiv Sofia

In:

Out:

Ludogorets

In:

Out:

Minyor

In:

Out:

Montana

In:

Out:

Slavia

In:

Out:

Svetkavitsa

In:

Out:

Vidima-Rakovski

In:

Out:

References

See also

 List of Cypriot football transfers summer 2011
 List of Dutch football transfers summer 2011
 List of English football transfers summer 2011
 List of Maltese football transfers summer 2011
 List of German football transfers summer 2011
 List of Greek football transfers summer 2011
 List of Portuguese football transfers summer 2011
 List of Spanish football transfers summer 2011
 List of Latvian football transfers summer 2011
 List of Serbian football transfers summer 2011

Bulgarian
2011 in Bulgarian sport
Summer 2011